Tibane, also known as Tibanefontein, is a large, sprawling village in Ga-Matlala in the Polokwane Local Municipality of the Capricorn District Municipality of the Limpopo province of South Africa. It is located 55 km northwest of the city of Polokwane on the intersection between the R567 and Matlala roads.

Demographics 
Africans of Sub-Saharan descent almost form the absolute majority of the settlement and newly arrived South Asian immigrants and people of mixed ancestry make up the remainder of the population. The South Asian migrants have managed to set up successful trading stores within a few years of their arrival. Northern Sotho is the dominant language, with Xitsonga, the unrecognised Urdu language and others forming a small minority. Christianity is the main religion of the villagers, however, the religion of Islam is growing at a rapid rate.

Infrastructure 
Tibane has electricity, tarred roads, a taxi rank, a sports stadium, a small claims court and piped, running water. Some basic facilities such as clinics, however, are still to be delivered. Tibani Shopping Centre is fully operational with a number of franchises, retails and other food chain stores. It will be located next to the taxi rank across Matlala Road. A housing development project called the Aganang Demarcation Project was created to provide housing and extend the settlement. The houses are set to be constructed east and south of the Matlala and R567 roads respectively.

Central Business District 
The Central Business District of Tibane includes a wide range of services which are rare in other villages of the municipality. These include many trading stores and general dealers; a filling station; panelbeaters and mechanics, a taxi rank; a post office; a small claims court; ICT shops; brick-manufacturers; steel and iron works and others. Some more formal businesses such as funeral parlours also have offices in the location. Matlala SAPS station is a mere 2 km south of the CBD in Ga-Ramokadikadi. Almost all of the businesses are located near the road intersection. The planned shopping centre will also form part of the CBD.

Education 
Sebušimadiša Pre-School.
Tibanefonten Primary School.
Makobateng Secondary School.

There are no institutions of higher learning in Tibane. The majority of successful matriculants opt for the University of Limpopo's Turfloop Campus to further their studies, while others opt for universities based in Gauteng.

Sports 
Football is the most popular sport in Tibane, as it is throughout the whole of Aganang. It is followed by netball which gets much of its support from girls and women. The construction of Tibane Stadium was a huge boost for sports in the village. There are two community football teams located on the side of the Matlala road. Skomboys FC and All Blacks FC are the oldest football teams aging back to the 1970s while Cool King FC was only found in the early 2000s. It has produced massive talent over the years but lack of financial support has always been a disadvantage to these young boys as they usually manage to make it to the junior professional football leagues in the country. Their careers are often short-lived as young boys are often the main breadwinners in their homes. They leave football for better-paying jobs in the city of Gauteng, Johannesburg and across the country.

References 

Populated places in the Polokwane Local Municipality